The Afrikaans Language and Culture Association (Afrikaans: Afrikaanse Taal- en Kultuurvereniging), ATKV, is a society that aims to promote the Afrikaans language and culture. The association was founded in 1930 in Cape Town. Since its inception and up to the end of Apartheid in 1994, membership was only open to members of the Afrikaner Christian community. Membership was thereafter opened to include people of all ethnicities, sharing the same values as the ATKV (i.e. speaking Afrikaans and belonging to the Christian faith).

History

The Witwatersrand Gold Rush of 1886 and Anglo Boer War (1899–1902) resulted in an influx of foreigners to the Zuid Afrikaanse Republiek. Because the Boer Republics became British colonies right after the Anglo Boer War, the Afrikaners felt marginalised and stigmatised. This culminated in the mass urbanisation of unskilled Afrikaners during the great depression years. Like many British soldiers and immigrants the impoverished Afrikaners found refuge in the former South African Railways. Provision was made for them by the South African Government in railway camps (a forerunner of the Apartheid Township) later known as "Spoorwegkampe".

The combination of the above factors caused the Afrikaners to fear erosion of their culture and language. In 1930 Edwin Robert Carney and Sybrand (Sybie) Jacobus van der Spuy started talking about an association for Afrikaners. Van der Spuy felt that an Afrikaans debate association would be sufficient. Edwin Carney showed preference to the idea of an Afrikaans language and culture association because in his opinion such an association would have more bargaining power to the authorities.

On Tuesday, 19 August 1930, twelve Afrikaners from different sections of the railway services met in Cape Town and the Afrikaans Language and Cultural Association (ATKV) was founded. Sybie van der Spuy was chosen as the first chairman and HJ Kamerman as the first secretary of the newly founded ATKV.

Controversy

The ATKV has been controversial on membership issues in the past, most notably:

  In 2000 the ATKV rejected two applicants because they did not comply with the organisation's policy that members had to belong to the Christian faith.
  Again, in 2004 the ATKV was as the center of a membership issue when it denied a Muslim couple membership to its Goudini spa.  Fritz Kok (managing director of the organisation at that time) said: "We do not exclude other religious beliefs and cultures from participating in projects and festivals which we run throughout the year. Everyone is welcome. However, when it comes to applying for membership, we have to be united in our beliefs as we are the ones who formulate important policies on various issues. The ATKV was founded with Christian values at the core of its operations. We follow all our business dealings and other operations under the guidance of what the Bible says. Therefore we cannot have members of other faiths join – there would be conflict of beliefs,".

Publications

Die Taalgenoot is a quarterly magazine published by the ATKV for its members, with content sourced from Afrikaans speaking people in South Africa and in the diaspora.

Holiday resorts

The ATKV owns and operates seven holiday resorts in South Africa. Historically these resorts were only open to white Afrikaans speakers that were members of the ATKV.  Since the early 1990s these resorts have been open to the general public with discount to organisation members.

These seven resorts are:
  Buffelspoort (near Rustenburg).
  Drakensville (nestles in the foothills of the majestic Amphitheatre in the Northern Drakensberg, approximately 350 km from Johannesburg and 250 km from Durban between the town Bergville and Jagersrust. ).
  Eiland Spa (within the Hans Merensky-nature reserve).
  Goudini Spa (near Worcester, Western Cape).
  Hartenbos (in Hartenbos).
  Klein-Kariba (near Bela-Bela).
  Natalia (near Winkelspruit).

Crescendo / CrescendoKreatief
Beginning 1994, ATKV started organising an annual music competition dedicated to Afrikaans music. The competition was known as Crescendo from its inception until 2005. In 2006, it was renamed CrescendoKreatief and became a songwriting-based competition. The competition was terminated after the 2012 competition season.

Winners of Crescendo

 1974 – Eoudia de Kock / Rouel Beukes
 1975 – Randall Wicomb
 1976 – Randall Wicomb
 1977 – Randall Wicomb
 1978 – Rina Hugo / Bruce Sanderson
 1979 – Anneli van Rooyen
 1980 – Karin Hougaard
 1981 – Gisela de Villiers
 1982 – Johan Badenhorst
 1983 – Stephen Mundell
 1984 – Take 5
 1985 – Innes / Franna Benadé
 1986 – Pieter van der Westhuizen / Gavin Davies
 1987 – Bosch-Troebadoers
 1988 – Coleské
 1989 – Greta Jones
 1990 – Die Boschenzangers
 1991 – Rian du Toit
 1992 – Natasja Groeneveld
 1993 – Lizanne Helberg

 1994 – Sanet Nel
 1995 – Wikus du Toit
 1997 – Anna Davel
 1998 – B-Natural
 1999 – Petronel Baard
 2000 – Réana Nel
 2001 – Joe Niemand / Jaco du Plessis
 2002 – Jak de Priester
 2003 – Hi-5
 2004 – Werner van Coller
 2005 – Carlè van Deventer

Winners of CrescendoKreatief
 2006 – Hanno van Heerden
 2007 – Geen
 2008 – William Loots
 2009 – Shane Heynie
 2010 – Elzahn Rinquest
 2011 – Babette Viljoen
 2012 – Fran Carstens

Projects
The ATKV has been active in many areas of South African culture and language.

Some projects ATKV are part of or sponsor include:
  National Afrikaans Olympiad
  Rieldans
  Ligteliedjiewerkswinkel (Song writing)
  Mediaveertjies (Media Awards)
  ATKV-Tienertoneel (Teen – Drama) https://atkv.org.za/neem-deel/jeugprojekte/tienertoneel/
  ATKV-Tjokkertoneel (Primary School - Drama) https://atkv.org.za/neem-deel/jeugprojekte/tjokkertoneel/
  ATKV-Skryfskool (Writing School)
  ATKV-Applous (School Choir Competition)https://atkv.org.za/neem-deel/jeugprojekte/applous/
  ATKV-Komposisiekompetisie (Composition Competition) https://atkv.org.za/neem-deel/musiek-en-dansprojekte/komposisiekompetisie/
  ATKV-Entrepreneurs  https://atkv.org.za/neem-deel/jeugprojekte/entrepreneurs/
  ATKV-Redenaars (Public speaking) https://atkv.org.za/neem-deel/jeugprojekte/redenaars/
  ATKV-Spanredenaars (Public Speaking)
  ATKV-Debat (Debate)https://atkv.org.za/neem-deel/jeugprojekte/debat/
  ATKV-Jeugleierssimposium (Youth leaders symposium) https://atkv.org.za/neem-deel/jeugprojekte/jeugleiersimposium/
  ATKV-Jeugberaad (Youth Discussion)https://atkv.org.za/neem-deel/jeugprojekte/jeugberaad/
  ATKV-Leiersontwikkeling (Leader Development)
  ATKV-Spelathon (Spelling competition) https://atkv.org.za/neem-deel/jeugprojekte/spelathon/

They also sponsor several South African arts festivals:
  Aardklop
  KKNK (Klein Karoo Nasionale Kunstefees)
  Nampo – Agricultural Trade Show (Held annually near Bothaville in the Free State Province).
  InniBOS
  Vryfees
  Woordfees
  Snoek & Patat Fees

Other areas of operation

ATKV Hartenbos Museum

During 1937 the ATKV decided to establish a museum in Hartenbos. As the idea of the Symbolic Ox Wagon Trek of 1938 originated in Hartenbos, the museum concentrates on the Great Trek of 1838 (when the Boers, dissatisfied with British rule, left the Cape Colony en masse). The museum also focuses on the history of Hartenbos itself.

The Museum is well stocked with ox wagons, weapons, and other historic artefacts, and is divided into ten halls depicting various aspects of the overall theme:

 Hall 1: Preparation for the Great Trek;
 Hall 2: Outspan (camping and relaxing) at the end of a day's journey;
 Hall 3: Repairing the ox wagons;
 Hall 4: Building the laager (a camp with the wagons drawn into a circle for protections against attack);
 Hall 5: Relaxation during the Great Trek
 Hall 6: Daily activities (baking bread, candle making);
 Hall 7: Settling after the journey (featuring family worship in a Boer homestead);
 Hall 8: The Voortrekkers’ freedom struggle;
 Hall 9: The Symbolic Ox Wagon Trek of 1938;
 Hall 10: The History of Hartenbos.

References 

Afrikaans
Afrikaner culture in South Africa
Afrikaner nationalism
Non-profit organisations based in South Africa
Organisations based in Johannesburg